Nemanja Miljanović (born 4 August 1971) is a Swedish former professional footballer who played for Elfsborg, Hércules and Salamanca. He currently works as a manager.

Miljanović also holds a Serbian passport.

Playing career
Miljanović arrived in Sweden at the age of 15. He played for Elfsborg, Hércules and was loaned out to Salamanca

Managerial career
After retiring as a player, Miljanović enjoyed a brief spell as manager of Bosnian side Proleter Teslić in 2008. In 2010, he managed at the lowest level of Spanish football with Alfaz del Pi. On 15 January 2018, he became the manager of Superettan side Eskilstuna.

On 24 August 2020, Miljanović was named manager of Bosnian Premier League club Mladost Doboj Kakanj. Five days later, on 29 August, in his first game as manager, Mladost beat Olimpik in a league match. He suffered his first loss as Mladost manager against Zrinjski Mostar two weeks later, on 12 September. Miljanović left Mladost at the end of the 2020–21 season.

On 18 August 2021, he became the new manager of Borac Banja Luka. On 22 August 2021, in Miljanović's debut game as Borac manager, his team drew against Rudar Prijedor in a league match. Seven days later, on 29 August, he recorded his first win as the club's manager, beating Radnik Bijeljina. On 3 April 2022, Miljanović resigned as manager following a disappointing league draw against Rudar Prijedor the previous day.

Shortly after, Miljanović became a part of Botev Plovdiv II's coaching staff. On 22 August 2022, he was appointed head coach of the team. At the end of December 2022, he was appointed manager of FC Krumovgrad.

Personal life
Miljanović's son Daniel is also a professional footballer.

References

External links

1971 births
Living people
People from Teslić
Serbs of Bosnia and Herzegovina
Swedish footballers
Swedish football managers
Association football midfielders
Swedish people of Serbian descent
Swedish expatriate sportspeople in Spain
Expatriate footballers in Spain
IF Elfsborg players
Allsvenskan players
Hércules CF players
La Liga players
Segunda División players
UD Salamanca players
Bosnia and Herzegovina emigrants to Sweden
Allsvenskan managers
Premier League of Bosnia and Herzegovina managers
Syrianska FC managers
IF Elfsborg managers
AFC Eskilstuna managers
FK Mladost Doboj Kakanj managers
FK Borac Banja Luka managers